Juan Mora may refer to:

People
 Juan Mora Fernández (1784-1854), Costa Rican head of state
 Juan Rafael Mora Porras (1814–1860), Costa Rican president
 Juan Mora Catlett (born 1931), Mexican film director
 Juan Luis Mora (footballer, born 1973), retired Spanish football goalkeeper
 Juan Luis Mora (footballer, born 1979), Chilean football goalkeeper

Places
 Juan José Mora Municipality, Venezuelan municipality